Spaghetti junction is a nickname sometimes given to a complex or massively intertwined road traffic interchange that is said to resemble a plate of spaghetti. Such interchanges may incorporate a variety of interchange design elements in order to maximize connectivity.

Etymology
The term was originally used to refer to the Gravelly Hill Interchange on the M6 motorway in Birmingham, United Kingdom. In an article published in the Birmingham Evening Mail on 1 June 1965 the journalist Roy Smith described plans for the junction as "like a cross between a plate of spaghetti and an unsuccessful attempt at a Staffordshire knot", with the headline above the article on the newspaper's front page, written by sub-editor Alan Eaglesfield, reading "Spaghetti Junction". Since then many complex interchanges around the world have acquired the nickname.

Throughout North America, this type of interchange is widely referred to as a spaghetti junction, mixing bowl, knot, or maze, often including the name of the freeway, city, or notable landmark near enough to the interchange.

By country

Australia

New South Wales
 Light Horse Interchange, at the junction of M7 Westlink Motorway and M4 Western Motorway in Eastern Creek, Sydney.

Victoria
 Springvale Junction at the intersection of Dandenong Road, Springvale Road, and Police and Centre Roads in Melbourne.

Queensland
 The interchange at the junction of M3 Inner City Bypass, M7 Clem Jones Tunnel, and M7 Airport Link in Bowen Hills, Brisbane, often referred to as "Spaghetti Junction" by local residents.

Botswana

 Thapama Interchange at the junction of A1 / Blue Jacket Street and A3 in Francistown.

Canada

Alberta 
 The interchange of Deerfoot Trail, Bow Bottom Trail, Anderson Road and 15 Street SE in Calgary. Maps were published in local newspapers to assist drivers with navigating the complex interchange when it opened in 1982.

Ontario

 The interchange between Bloor Street, Dundas Street, and Kipling Avenue in Toronto's west end, officially known as the Six Points Interchange, but often referred to as the "Spaghetti Junction". This interchange was demolished and reconfigured between 2019–21 to become at-grade junctions.
 The interchange between Highway 427 and the Queen Elizabeth Way and Gardiner Expressway has been referred to as a "messy spaghetti junction" by UrbanToronto.

Quebec 

 The Turcot Interchange the largest interchange in the province of Quebec, and the third busiest in Montréal.

Germany 

 The Kreuz Kaiserberg interchange between the A3, which runs from the Dutch border near Elten via Oberhausen and Frankfurt am Main to the Austrian border south of Passau, and the A40 (Ruhrschnellweg) from Venlo to Dortmund.

Indonesia
 The interchange between Waru-Juanda Toll Road, Surabaya–Gempol Toll Road, and Surabaya–Mojokerto Toll Road in border of Surabaya and Sidoarjo, East Java.

Malaysia
The Penchala Interchange between Damansara-Shah Alam Elevated Expressway (DASH), Damansara-Puchong Expressway (LDP) and Sprint Expressway (Penchala Link). The interchange also links to local roads to Damansara Perdana, Mutiara Damansara and Kampung Penchala.

New Zealand
 Central Motorway Junction, the intersection of New Zealand State Highway 1 and Highway 16, as well as several separate on-and off-ramp clusters, south of the city centre of Auckland.

South Africa

 EB Cloete Interchange, the intersection of the N2 and N3 freeways in Durban.

United Kingdom
 Gravelly Hill Interchange, which the phrase "Spaghetti Junction" originated from, is the five-level intersection of the M6 motorway (Junction 6), A38(M) motorway, A38 road and A5127 road above a railway line, three canals and a river in Birmingham. The phrase comes from the birds-eye view of the road, with the roads interconnecting. 
 Worsley Braided Interchange, between the M60 (formerly M62), M61, A580 and A666(M), between Manchester and Bolton, which opened in 1970.

United States

Alabama
Downtown Birmingham

California
 MacArthur Maze, in Oakland, also called the "Distribution Structure", connects I-80 west, I-80 east / I-580 west, I-580 east to SR-24 / I-980, and I-880 south.

Florida
 Golden Glades Interchange, in Miami Gardens and North Miami Beach, connects U.S. Route 441 (US 441), Florida's Turnpike, the Palmetto Expressway (signed State Road 826), SR 9, North Miami Beach Boulevard (NW 167th Street) and Interstate 95 (I-95).

Georgia

 Tom Moreland Interchange, the interchange of I-85 and I-285 as well as Chamblee-Tucker Road and Northcrest Road in DeKalb County just outside Atlanta.

Illinois

 Jane Byrne Interchange, locally known as "the spaghetti bowl", is the intersection of the Kennedy Expressway, the Dan Ryan Expressway, the Eisenhower Expressway, and Ida B. Wells Drive just southwest of downtown Chicago.

Indiana
 The concurrency between Interstate 65 and Interstate 70 in Indianapolis, particularly at the "North Split."

Kentucky
 Kennedy Interchange, the intersection of I-64, I-65, and I-71 at the northeastern edge of Downtown Louisville.

Massachusetts

 The South Bay Interchange between I-90 (Massachusetts Turnpike) and I-93/US 1/MA 3 in Boston.

Minnesota
 The intersection of I-94, I-35, US 12, US 52 and MN-55 at the southeastern edge of Downtown Minneapolis.
 The "Can of Worms" interchange in Duluth, between I-35 and US 53/I-535.

Missouri
 The Downtown Loop interchange of 23 exits, four Interstate Highways, four U.S. Highways and numerous city streets in downtown Kansas City, Missouri.

Nevada
 Henderson Spaghetti Bowl (or the "Hender-Bender") in Henderson (I-11/I-515/US 93/US 95, I-215, Lake Mead Parkway)
 Las Vegas Spaghetti Bowl, the interchange of I-15, I-515, US 93 and US 95 in Downtown Las Vegas, which also includes access to/from Martin Luther King Jr. Boulevard.
 Reno Spaghetti Bowl, the interchange of I-80, I-580 and US 395 in Reno, which also includes access to/from Battle Born Way (formerly Kietzke Lane) and East 4th Street and Prater Way in Sparks.

New Jersey
 Exit 53 on I-80 where the highway meets with US 46 and Route 23

Pennsylvania
 The intersection of I-81 and Route 22

Tennessee
 Malfunction Junction, the interchange between I-275 (formerly I-75) and I-40 in Knoxville, Tennessee
 The interchange between I-65 and I-440 in Nashville.

Texas

 Spaghetti Bowl, where I-45, Allen Parkway, Memorial Drive, Houston Avenue, McKinney Street, Dallas Street, and Pierce Street meet in Downtown Houston.
 Spaghetti Bowl, where I-10, I-110, and US 54 meet just east of Downtown El Paso, Texas.

Utah
 Spaghetti Bowl, where I-15, I-80, and State Route 201 meet in the cities of Salt Lake City and South Salt Lake. This interchange also has access to 2100 South and 900 West.

See also
 Magic Roundabout
 Malfunction Junction (disambiguation)
 Mixing Bowl
 Spaghetti code
 Stack interchange

References

Road interchanges
Metaphors referring to spaghetti